The Letov Š-33 was a 1930s prototype Czechoslovakian long-range bomber, designed and built by Letov.

Development
Intended to meet a Czech military requirement and designed as a three-seat long-range bomber, the Š-33 first flew in 1930. The Š-33 was a cantilever mid-wing monoplane with a conventional tailskid landing gear. Powered by an 800 hp (597 kW) Isotta Fraschini engine, the Š-33 was tested but no production order was placed.

Specifications

References

Notes

Bibliography

External links
 Válka, Letov Š-33 :: Letov :: Československo / ČR / SR (CZK/CZE/SVK) (multilingual)

S-33
1930s Czechoslovakian bomber aircraft
Single-engined tractor aircraft
Mid-wing aircraft
Aircraft first flown in 1930